Rubén Techera (born 12 December 1946) is a Uruguayan footballer. He played in three matches for the Uruguay national football team in 1967. He was also part of Uruguay's squad for the 1967 South American Championship.

References

External links
 

1946 births
Living people
Uruguayan footballers
Uruguay international footballers
Association football midfielders
Rampla Juniors players
Club Nacional de Football players
C.A. Cerro players
José Gálvez FBC footballers
Club Universitario de Deportes footballers
Atlante F.C. footballers
Unión de Curtidores footballers
Uruguayan expatriate footballers
Expatriate footballers in Peru
Expatriate footballers in Mexico